A Bachelor of Human Kinetics (BHk or BHKin) or Bachelor of Science in Human Kinetics (BScHK) is a four-year academic degree awarded by a university upon the completion of a program of study of Human kinetics. Specializations within this degree can include:  Athletic Therapy, Kinesiology, Physical Education, Recreation, and Sport management.

Human Kinetics, Bachelor